Dokota is a small town located in Mailsi Tehsil in the Vehari District of Punjab, Pakistan.

The town is situated on the Mailsi-Multan Road. It is 70 km (44 miles) Southeast of Multan and 19 km (11 miles) West of Mailsi. The vast majority of the population work in the agricultural sector. It is the main hub of all financial and social activity in the surrounding area.
 
Dokota is distinguished by the Masjid Sarwar-e-Konain and Faizan E Madina Dawateislami mosques.

Inhabitants of Dokota mostly belong to the Punjabi and Saraiki-speaking communities, and the arian caste. After the 1947 Partition of India, a Punjabi community was established in Dokota after migrating from East Punjab of India.
 
The Constituency NA-165 and Constituency PP-235 govern the region, predominantly focusing on the traditional "Thana Culture" of Punjab.

It is situated on the bank of canal named 11_l.
It has four main roads 1st to multan, 2nd is to mailsi, 3rd is to dunyapur, 4th is to mitru. 
Near villages Malikpur 205/w.b, 195/w.b, 151/w.b, 211/w.b, basti kochhy, 143/w.b.
Government High School Dokota for boys is only government institute. 
Other are private as ilahi, Educators, Green School System, altahir, Muslim, moon public schools.

References

Populated places in Vehari District